Koa Ridge is a town being developed by Castle & Cooke located near the center of the island of Oahu in City and County of Honolulu, Hawaiʻi, United States.

History
Koa Ridge sits on former plantation fields owned by Castle & Cooke, which began planning for its development in the late 1990s.  It is a planned community south of Mililani Town and north of Waipio.  It was originally planned to have Koa Ridge Makai on the west side of interstate H2 and Koa Ridge Mauka on the east side of interstate H2.  However, through project opposition and delays, only Makai is being developed.  It is situated about 9 miles (15 km) northwest of the center of Honolulu.  The ground was broken for Koa Ridge on November 2, 2017.  The first homeowners moved into Koa Ridge in November 2020.

Description
Koa Ridge is a town being developed by Castle & Cooke located near the center of the island of Oahu in City and County of Honolulu, Hawaiʻi, United States. It is planned to house approximately 3,500 units, a medical center, a community center, parks, an elementary school, and commercial facilities.

Geography
It is in the Central District and the City & County of Honolulu.

Traveling north on either Kamehameha Highway (State Rte. 99) or Interstate H-2 connects the traveler with Mililani. Traveling south on either of these arteries connects to Waipio.

The U.S. postal code for Koa Ridge is 96787.

Demographics
Approximately 3,500 units are being developed and 30% of the development is dedicated to affordable housing units following the County affordable and State condominium sales guidelines.

Education
An elementary public school in Koa Ridge is planned to be developed and operated by the Hawaiʻi Department of Education.

References

External links
 Castle & Cooke Koa Ridge Development Site
 Koa Ridge Community Masterplan

Planned cities in the United States
Populated places established in 2020
Populated places on Oahu
2020 establishments in Hawaii